Keenan (Cianán) is a male Irish name which means "ancient, distant". Keenan is an Anglicisation of the Irish name Cianán which is a diminutive of Cian. The Ó Cianáin clan (Keenan) were the traditional historians to the McGuire clan. Keenan is also a surname.

Origins 
Recorded as O'Keenan and more usually Keenan, this is an Irish surname. Found mainly in the Ulster and northern counties of Fermanagh and Monaghan, it originates from the ancient pre 10th century Gaelic name O' Cianain meaning "The descendant of the faithful one" or similar. It may not have been entirely coincidence that the clan was famous throughout the Medieval Period for producing both high-ranking members of the church, and early historians, in several cases the same thing. The first recorded scribe was Adam O' Caianain, who was also the canon of Lisgool in Fermanagh. He is mentioned in the annals known as the "Four Masters" as being the historian to the famous Maguires of County Fermanagh. It is said that in 1659 in Petty's Census of Ireland that the spelling was found as MacKeenan, but if so this spelling is now completely extinct and research suggests that the original recording may have been a clerical mistake.

According to the United States' Social Security Administration , Keenan was the 607th most popular first name for newborns in the United States in 2006, which is a decrease from being the 362nd most popular in 1992.

People named Keenan

First name
 Keenan Garvey, Entrepreneur
 Keenan Allen, American football wide receiver
 Keenan Cornelius, American jiu-jitsu practitioner
 Keenan Clayton, American football linebacker
 Keenan Evans (born 1996), American basketball player in the Israel Basketball Premier League
 Keenan Hollahan, pseudonym for advice columnist 
 Keenan McCardell, former American football wide receiver
 Keenan Robinson, American football linebacker
 Kenan Thompson, American actor and comedian
 Keenen Ivory Wayans, American comedian, director and writer
 Keenan Wynn, American character actor

Last name
 Brian Keenan (Irish republican), Provisional IRA member
 Brian Keenan (musician born 1943), American musician
 Brian Keenan (writer), Irish journalist and hostage
 Brigid Keenan, British/Irish writer of best-selling memoirs "Diplomatic Baggage"
 Cathy Keenan, Canadian television actor
 Celia Keenan-Bolger, American stage actor and singer
 David Keenan, Scottish writer and musician
 Deborah Keenan, American  poet and educator
 Don Keenan, Canadian ice hockey goaltender
 Donal Keenan, Irish Gaelic games administrator
 Edward L. Keenan, American historian of medieval Russia
 Frank Keenan, American stage and screen actor and director
 Frank Keenan (hurler) Irish hurling player
 Harold Keenan, English footballer
 Harry Keenan, American screen actor
 Helen Grace Scott Keenan, American journalist, OSS employee and Soviet spy
 Henry Francis Keenan, American journalist and author
 Joe Keenan (footballer), British footballer
 Joe Keenan (writer), American writer and playwright
 John Keenan (Medal of Honor), U.S. Army soldier
 John F. Keenan, American attorney and federal judge
 John R. Keennan (1940–2015), American baseball scout
 Joseph B. Keenan, chief prosecutor in the International Military Tribunal for the Far East
 Joseph Henry Keenan, American thermodynamicist
 Lillie Keenan (born 1996), American show jumping rider
 Luke A. Keenan (1872–1924), New York politician
 Maynard James Keenan, American singer of bands Tool, A Perfect Circle and Puscifer
 Mike Keenan, Canadian ice hockey manager
 Nancy Keenan, American politician and pro-choice campaigner
 Norbert Keenan, Australian politician
 Paddy Keenan, Irish uilleann piper

 Pepper Keenan, American musician with Corrosion of Conformity
 Peter Keenan ("Crackers" Keenan), former Australian rules footballer
 Peter Keenan (boxer), Scottish boxer of the 1940s, and 1950s
 Philip Childs Keenan (1908-2000), American astronomer
 Phuwaryne Keenan (born 1988), Thai singer
 Sinead Keenan, Irish actress
 Shy Keenan, British author, child sexual abuse survivor, and founder of Phoenix Survivors
 Sterling James Keenan, American pro wrestler
 Tamra Keenan, British singer
 Terry Keenan, American broadcast television business correspondent
 Vernon Keenan, American law enforcement officer
Fictional
 Gareth Keenan, character from UK television series The Office

See also
List of Irish-language given names
Keenen, given name
Kenan (disambiguation)

Irish masculine given names
English-language surnames